Piedra or tuniche is a Mexican dish. It consists of a corn dumpling with some sort of stuffing, which is fried until crunchy consistency. Piedras are commonly accompanied with pink onion, chopped lettuce and guacamole.

References
Muñoz Zurita, Ricardo. Small Larousee of Mexican Gastronomy. (2013). .

External links

Mexican cuisine